Barbara Janet Archer (born in London in 1933) is a British actress. She is perhaps best known for her appearance in the 1958 film Dracula, starring Christopher Lee and
Peter Cushing.

Selected filmography
 A Kid for Two Farthings (1955) - Madam Rita's Workroom Girl (uncredited)
 Oh... Rosalinda!! (1955) - Lady
 Lost (1956) - bit role (uncredited)
 Jumping for Joy (1956) - Marlene 
 The Feminine Touch (1956) - Liz Jenkins 
 Eyewitness (1956) - bit role (uncredited)
 Three Men in a Boat (1956) - Pretty Girl (uncredited)
 The Passionate Stranger (1957) - Doris the barmaid 
 The Good Companions (1957) - Barmaid
 Miracle in Soho (1957) - Gwladys 
 The Shiralee (1957) - Shopgirl 
 Strangers' Meeting (1957) - Rosie Foster 
 Dracula (1958) - Inga 
 Model for Murder (1959) - Betty Costard 
 In the Wake of a Stranger (1959) - Barmaid 
 Libel (1959) - Barmaid
 Devil's Bait (1959) - Switchboard Operator (uncredited)
 633 Squadron (1964) - Rosie the barmaid at the Black Swan Inn 
 Rattle of a Simple Man (1964) - Iris 
 Up the Junction (1968) - May (final film role)

Selected television
 The Adventures of Robin Hood (1957)

References

External links
 

1933 births
British film actresses
British television actresses
20th-century British actresses
Living people